Johannes Nicolai Eckhoff (26 April 1919 – 26 October 2007) was a Norwegian actor. He made his stage debut at Trøndelag Teater in 1939, and has later worked for Centralteatret, Det Nye Teater and Riksteatret. He participated in the film Englandsfarere in 1946, and in Kampen om tungtvannet from 1948. He contributed to several radio and television series for children at the Norwegian Broadcasting Corporation.

References

External links

1919 births
2007 deaths
Male actors from Oslo
Norwegian male stage actors
Norwegian male film actors
Norwegian male radio actors